The Bristol Borough School District is a diminutive, suburban, public school district located in southern Bucks County, Pennsylvania. The district serves the Borough of Bristol. It encompasses just , with a population of 12,000 people at the 1990 federal census. According to 2000 federal census data, it served a resident population of 9,923 people. By 2010, the cistrict's population declined further to 9,729 people. In 2009, Bristol Borough School District residents’ per capita income was $17,198, while the median family income was $44,517. In the Commonwealth, the median family income was $49,501 and the United States median family income was $49,445, in 2010.

The district is served by Bucks County IU 22 for special education services and professional development programs.

Bristol Borough School District operates Bristol Jr./Sr. High School and Snyder-Girotti Elementary School.

Extracurriculars
Bristol Borough School District offers a variety of clubs, activities interscholastic sports.

Sports
The district funds:

Boys
Baseball – AA
Basketball- AA
Bowling – AAAAAA
Cross country – A
Football – A
Track and field – AA
Wrestling	– AA

Girls
Basketball – AA
Bowling – AAAAAA
Cheer – AAAAAA
Cross country – A
Field hockey – A
Softball – AA
Track and field – AA

Middle school sports

Boys
Baseball
Basketball
Football
Wrestling	

Girls
Basketball
Cheer
Field hockey
Softball

According to PIAA directory March 2018.

References 

School districts in Bucks County, Pennsylvania